Jonathan "Jonty" Parkin (1894–1972) was an English professional rugby league footballer who played the 1910s, 1920s and 1930s. One of the nine inaugural inductees of the Rugby Football League Hall of Fame, he toured Australia three times, twice as captain of Great Britain, earning 17 Test caps. Parkin gave the Wakefield Trinity club seventeen years' service, including victory in the 1924–25 Yorkshire Cup.

Background
Parkin was born in Sharlston on 5 November 1894, and later played for the Sharlston rugby league club.

Playing career

Wakefield Trinity
Parkin joined Wakefield Trinity as an 18-year-old in 1913 (Heritage No. 207). He would go on to become captain of the club. Parkin played  in Wakefield Trinity's 0–6 defeat by Hull F.C. in the 1913–14 Challenge Cup Final at Thrum Hall, Halifax, in front of a crowd of 19,000, He also won caps for Yorkshire while at Wakefield Trinity.

International
Parkin was selected to go on the 1920 Great Britain Lions tour of Australasia. He was the Landlord of the Griffin Hotel, Bull Ring, Wakefield circa-1921. Parkin played  in Wakefield Trinity's 9–8 victory over Batley in the 1924–25 Yorkshire Cup Final at Headingley Rugby Stadium, Leeds on Saturday 22 November 1924, and played  in the 3–10 defeat by Huddersfield in the 1926–27 Yorkshire County Cup Final during the 1926–27 season at Headingley Rugby Stadium, Leeds on Wednesday 1 December 1926. Parkin played  in Wakefield Trinity's 3–29 defeat by Australia in the 1921–22 Kangaroo tour of Great Britain match at Belle Vue, Wakefield on Saturday 22 October 1921.

Parkin won caps for England while at Wakefield Trinity in 1921 against Wales, Other Nationalities and Australia, in 1922 against Wales, in 1923 against Wales, in 1924 against Other Nationalities, in 1925 against Wales, in 1926 against Wales and Other Nationalities, in 1927 against Wales, in 1928 against Wales (2 matches) and won caps for Great Britain while at Wakefield Trinity in 1920 against Australia (2 matches) and New Zealand (3 matches), in 1921–22 against Australia (2 matches), in 1924 against Australia (3 matches) and New Zealand, in 1926–27 against New Zealand (2 matches), in 1928 against Australia and New Zealand and in 1929 against Australia (2 matches). Parkin was unavailable for the first Test of the 1929–30 Ashes series, and the game was lost to the touring Australians. He recovered for the second Test and Great Britain ultimately defended the Ashes.

Hull Kingston Rovers
Parkin decided he wanted to leave Wakefield Trinity in 1930, at the age of thirty-four, and he was put on the transfer list at £100. For some reason, Hull Kingston Rovers couldn't, or wouldn't, find the money. So Parkin paid the fee himself to secure his release. The game's by-laws were adjusted shortly afterwards, so that no player could ever do that again.

Parkin appears to have scored no drop-goals (or field-goals as they are currently known in Australasia), but prior to the 1974–75 season all goals, whether; conversions, penalties, or drop-goals, scored 2-points, consequently prior to this date drop-goals were often not explicitly documented, therefore '0' drop-goals may indicate drop-goals not recorded, rather than no drop-goals scored. In addition, prior to the 1949–50 season, the archaic field-goal was also still a valid means of scoring points.

Post-playing
Parkin served as an administrator of the Wakefield club after retiring from playing. He died in his home town of Wakefield on 9 April 1972 at the age of 77. In 1988 Parkin was one of the inaugural nine inductees into the Rugby Football League Hall of Fame.

Personal
Parkin married Frances Akeroyd in 1926 and had six children, Patricia, Nadine, Willie (Bill), Geoff, Neal and Trevor, and 16 grandchildren.

References

External links
(archived by web.archive.org) Jonty Parkin at rugbyleaguehistory.co.uk

1894 births
1972 deaths
England national rugby league team captains
England national rugby league team players
English rugby league players
Great Britain national rugby league team captains
Great Britain national rugby league team players
Hull Kingston Rovers players
People from Sharlston
Rugby league five-eighths
Rugby league halfbacks
Rugby league players from Wakefield
Wakefield Trinity captains
Wakefield Trinity players
Yorkshire rugby league team captains
Yorkshire rugby league team players